Mujer Divina – Homenaje a Agustín Lara (English: "Divine Woman – Tribute to Agustín Lara"), is the fourth studio album and first tribute album Mexican recording artist Natalia Lafourcade. The project is a tribute to Mexican singer and songwriter Agustín Lara and is composed of songs by him featuring different guest singers such as Adrián Dárgelos from Babasónicos, León Larregui from Zoé, Devendra Banhart, Kevin Johansen, Adanowsky, Emmanuel del Real from Café Tacvba, Miguel Bosé, Ismael Salcedo from Los Daniels, Leonardo de Lozanne, Lila Downs, Leonel García, Jorge Drexler and Francisco Familiar from DLD. The album was released on September 18, 2012. The project was accompanied by a DVD of live versions of the songs of the album. A live version of the album recorded at the Sala Telefónica from the Centro Cultural Roberto Cantoral was released on February 11, 2014.

At the 14th Annual Latin Grammy Awards, the album won Best Alternative Music Album and Best Long Form Music Video while Carlos Campón, Ernesto García, Noah Georgeson, Demian Nava, Sebastían Schon, César Sogbe and José Blanco received a nomination for Best Engineered Album as engineers of the album.

Background
After the release of her previous projects, Las 4 Estaciones del Amor (2007) and Hu Hu Hu (2009), Lafourcade felt the need to explore new music with already existing songs intead of original songs. When working with Alondra de la Parra for a performance in Ciudad de México, she started to search songs from different composers to perform and end up finding a deep connection to Agustín Lara's work.

The name of the album, according to Lafourcade comes from the way women were the main inspiration for Lara and how his songs made her "appreciate the beauty of women and femininity". The album is composed of songs from Lara featuring guest singers, to balance the themes of femeninity, Lafourcade decided that the guest singers would be mostly male.

Track listing
All tracks were written by Agustín Lara, except where noted.

Charts

Weekly charts

Year-end charts

Album certification

References

External links
Sitio oficial.

2012 albums
Natalia Lafourcade albums
Sony Music Mexico albums